Abularach is a surname. Notable people with the surname include:

 Gabby Abularach, American musician
 Jorge Briz Abularach (born 1955), Guatemalan politician
 Rodolfo Abularach (1933–2020), Guatemalan artist of Palestinian descent